Edward Leon Jabłoński (13 October 1919 – 17 November 1970) was a Polish soccer midfield player who represented both Cracovia and the Polish National Team. Born on 13 October 1919 in Krakow, Jabłoński was one of the few players who participated in games of the national team both before and after Second World War. He died on 17 November 1970, also in Krakow.

Jablonski played in the right midfield, for Cracovia Krakow in the seasons 1938-39 and, after the war, in 1948-1950. In 1948, when Cracovia became the champion of Poland, he was the captain of the team.

Altogether, he took part in 3 international friendlies, scoring 1 goal (interesting is the fact that his lone goal was the first for the Polish National Team after the war). His made his debut on 27 August 1939 in Warsaw (Poland - Hungary 4-2). During the war, he did not play officially, as the German occupiers banned Poles from practising any kind of sports. His last game with the national team took place on 19 July 1947 in Warsaw (Poland - Romania 1-2).

See also
 The last game: 27 August 1939, Poland - Hungary 4-2

References

1919 births
1970 deaths
MKS Cracovia (football) players
Polish footballers
Poland international footballers
Polish football managers
MKS Cracovia managers
Footballers from Kraków
People from Kraków Voivodeship (1919–1939)
Association football midfielders